The Greek Expeditionary Force (GEF) in Korea (romanized: Ekstrateftikon Soma Ellados, abbreviated ΕΚΣΕ) was formed in response to the United Nations appeal for assistance in the Korean War. It comprised a reinforced Hellenic Army infantry battalion and a Royal Hellenic Air Force (RHAF) flight of seven transport planes. Greece was the fifth largest troop contributor to U.N. Forces in Korea. 

The Greek forces brought valuable combat experience from their war against communist guerrillas in Greece and they were also skilled in using American weapons. Because of the mountainous terrain in their homeland, they easily acclimated to the Korean topography. At the height of the war 1,263 Greek soldiers and airmen were in Korea.

RHAF Transport Flight

The seven C-47s of 13th Flight, with 67 Air Force officers and personnel, departed from Elefsis air base at 0830 on November 11, 1950. They belonged to the 355 Transport Squadron, known for its participation in the recent civil war. The majority of the officers and NCOs of this first mission were experienced airmen, being veterans of the Mediterranean and Middle East Theatre of World War II and the Greek Civil War.

On December 3, 1950, the first Greek aircraft landed on Korean soil. The Greek flight was immediately attached to the 21st Troop Carrier Sqn. (later renamed 6461 TC Sqn.) of the 374th Wing, United States Air Force, based initially at Daegu. From May 14, 1951, the flight was based at Kimpo air base where it remained until May 23, 1955. During its time in Korea, the Greek Flight carried out 2,916 missions, comprising air evacuations, the transport of personnel and prisoners, drops of supplies and ammunition, the replenishment of allied bases and the collection of operational information. In total, its planes carried 70,568 passengers, including 9,243 wounded. It logged 13,777 flight hours. Losses included 12 officers and NCOs and two C-47s.

Sparta Battalion
The Greek government originally intended to send a brigade to Korea, but with quick UN victories in the autumn of 1950, the expeditionary force was downgraded to a battalion. The army unit, called the Sparta Battalion, which was sent in November 1950 under Spartan Lieutenant Colonel Georgios Koumanakos, was composed of 849 men and six vehicles in an HQ company and three rifle companies; with one machine gun/mortar platoon and three rifle platoons in each. The men were all volunteers from the 1st, 8th and 9th Infantry Divisions. The unit's officers were selected based on their fluency in English.

From August 23, 1951, the component was expanded to 1,063 men, at which strength it remained until the December 1953 armistice. It was subsequently increased to the level of 2,163 men until April 1955. After the anti-Greek Istanbul Pogrom, in September 1955, relations with Greece's NATO ally, Turkey, deteriorated and Athens decided to recall its units stationed in Korea. As a result, only 191 men were still in the country by December 1955. A representative section of one officer and nine men remained until May 1958.

Battalion events timeline
 1950
 November 15: Embarkation at Piraeus.
 December 9: Arrival at Busan.
 December 16: Move to Suwon, attached to the US 1st Cavalry Division as the "4th Battalion (GEF), 7th Cavalry Regiment".

 1951
 January 16: Remnants sweeping operation at Wolaksan, Haseoksan, Munsusan and Sinseol summits.
 January 29: Battle with 3,000 Chinese at Hill 381, west of Icheon.
 February 8: Battle with the Chinese Army at Hill 489, north of Gonjiam-ri.
 March 7: Attack on Hill 326, east of Yongdu-ri.
 April 7: Advance to Geumhaksan, north of Hongchen.
 April 27: Defence of Hongje-dong area of Seoul.
 May 26: Advance to Imjingang via Nogosan and Gamaksan.
 June 9: Advance to Wyoming line, north of Yeoncheon.
 August 4: Battle with the Chinese Army near Churadong area.
 September 26: Attack against the Chinese Army at the Big Nori Hill.
 October 3–10: Battle with the Chinese Army at Hill 313 ("Scotch Hill"). The hill was captured on 5 October 5, with 28 KIA.
 December 30: Deployed at Imjingang S-curved area.

 1952
 January: patrol duties attached to the 15th Infantry Regiment, US 3rd Infantry Division.
 March 17: Battle over Kelly, Nori, Betty outposts.
 May 23: The 1st company guards Kohe-do island prisoner camp.
 July 23: Advance to Imjingang S-curved area again after improving the corps for four months.
 August 7: Surprise attack on Hill 167 near Imjingang.
 September 28: Battle with the Chinese Army near Nori Hill area.
 October 29: Return to the US 9th corps, move to Cheolwon area.
 December 14: Entice and destroy one Chinese company at Yujeong-ri.
 December 27: 14 soldiers killed in a transport aircraft crash in Jinhae.

 1953
 March 11: Battle between reconnaissance squads at Hill 438.
 May 16: Deployed at Junggasan, north eastern sides of Cheolwon.
 June 16: Battle with the Chinese Army at Hill 420 (Outpost Harry).
 July 16: Battle with the Chinese Army at Hill 495, south of Bukjeon-hyeon.
 July 25: Battle with the Chinese Army at Hill 492, north of Seungam-ri.

195 or 188 or 174  men were killed in action and 610 or 459 or 153 wounded. 2 POWs repatriated to Greece after the war.
A total of 4,992 or 10,581 Greek personnel fought at Korea during the war.

Awards and recognitions

The 13th Flight received a US Presidential Unit Citation for its participation in the evacuation of US Marines at Hagaru-ri in December 1950. The GEF Spartan battalion received its first US Presidential Unit Citation in February 1952 for the capture of Scotch Hill.

The Greek infantry company involved in the defense of Outpost Harry received the following Presidential Unit Citation:

"DEPARTMENT OF THE ARMY Washington D. C., 10 March 1955
GENERAL ORDERS 18

DISTINGUISHED UNIT CITATION
Company P Greek Expeditionary Forces Battalion (Second Award) is cited for extraordinary heroism and outstanding performance of duty in action against an armed enemy in the vicinity of Surang-Ni, Korea during the period 17 June to 18 June 1953. Assigned the defense of a vital outpost position (Harry), the company encountered a major enemy assault on the evening of June 17. After an intense concentration of enemy mortar and artillery fire, the hostile forces, which had taken up an attack position on the northeast and northwest side of the outpost, moved rapidly through their own and friendly artillery fire to gain a foothold on the northern slope of the position. Refusing to withdraw, Company P closed in and met the attackers in a furious hand-to-hand struggle in which many of the enemy were driven off. The aggressors regrouped, quickly attacked a second time, and again gained the friendly trenches. Immediately, the Greek Forces launched a series of counterattacks, simultaneously dispatching a diversionary force to the east of the outpost which successfully channeled the enemy thrusts. After 2 hours of close-in fighting, the aggressors were again routed and the friendly positions restored. The outstanding conduct and exemplary courage exhibited by members of Company P, Greek Expeditionary Forces Battalion, reflects great credit on themselves and are in keeping with the finest traditions of the military service and the Kingdom of Greece."

Individual Greeks received six U.S. Distinguished Service Crosses, 32 Silver Stars, 110 Bronze Stars. 19 members of 13th Flight received the US Air Force Air Medal for the Hagaru-ri evacuation operation in December 1950. The Greek battalion's war flag also received the highest Greek military decoration, the Commander's Cross of the Cross of Valour, in 1954.

Helping Korean civilians
The Greeks were interested in the welfare of Korean civilians. They especially treated Korean children with great kindness including the feeding, clothing and sheltering of Korean orphans, possibly because of the kidnapping of Greek children by Communists during the Greek civil war.

Religious work in South Korea
Greek military chaplains played a prime role in the preservation of the Korean Orthodox Church during the Korean War. This small religious body, founded by Russian Orthodox missionaries during the czarist era, had suffered persecution due to a series of historical developments -- the Japanese colonization of Korea, the rise of communism in Russia, World War II and the division of the Korean Peninsula. The Korean War added to the devastation. When Greek chaplains became aware of the Korean church, its flock had been scattered and its clergy were dead or presumed dead. The Greeks helped arrange ordination of new Korean clergy and eventually helped the church affiliate with an Orthodox bishop overseas. Today, the church has its own resident bishop and has thousands of members in South Korea.

Memorials and Monuments
In 1961 Greece installed a plaque at the UN Memorial Cemetery in Busan. The plaque reads “From Greece for her fallen sons in gratitude”.

In 1974 South Korea raised a Greek War Memorial in Yeoju, with the names of the Greeks who were killed in the war engraved on it.

At the Korea War Memorial in Seoul there is a commemorative stele at the “Monument for the Participants” section.

On the Tomb of the Unknown Soldier in Athens the word "Korea" is engraved on the tomb in order to honor the men who were killed during the war.

Motion picture
The American feature film The Glory Brigade deals with the mission of the Greek military and its joint operations with U.S. forces in the Korean War. The movie was shot in Hollywood and on location in rural Missouri in late 1952, and it was released in spring 1953, shortly before the end of the war. Film star Victor Mature plays a U.S. officer of Greek descent in the movie. Alexander Scourby, an American actor of Greek heritage, plays a Greek officer.

References

Further reading

External links

 Outpost Harry Project
 Outpost Harry Survivors Association
 History War Museum - UNITED NATIONS ARMY, GREEK EXPEDITIONARY FORCE IN KOREA
 Article on 13th Transport Flight from the official Hellenic Air Force website (in Greek)
 Royal Hellenic (Greek) Forces
 The 13th Flight of the RHAF in Korea
 The 60th Anniversary Of The Korean War Commemoration Committee
 The Monument for the Participation of Greece in the Korean War
 Heroes of the Korean War: Lieutenant Colonel George Koumanakos (part 1)
 Heroes of the Korean War: Lieutenant Colonel George Koumanakos (part 2)
 A brief history of the Greek Expeditionary Force from the Greek  Army 
 Korea (November 1950-May 1958) 
The Greek Expeditionary Force in Korea 1950-1955

Videos
 

 

 

 
 
 U.N. Greek Battalion In Korea from the British Pathé
 Greek Troops For Korea from the Associated Press

Military units and formations of Greece in the Korean War
Wars involving Greece
Commander's Crosses of the Cross of Valour (Greece)
United Nations contingents in Korea
History of Greece (1949–1974)
Military units and formations established in 1950
Military units and formations disestablished in 1958
Greece–South Korea relations
Greece and the United Nations
Expeditionary units and formations
Greece